Kona is a ward in Jalingo Local Government Area of Taraba State, Nigeria.

References 

Local Government Areas in Taraba State